Lorentz's mosaic-tailed rat (Paramelomys lorentzii) is a species of rodent in the family Muridae. It is found in West Papua, Indonesia and Papua New Guinea. The rat is named after Hendrikus Albertus Lorentz, a Dutch explorer who passed through Lorentz National Park on his 1909–10 expedition.

According to the Kalam people of Madang Province, Papua New Guinea, it helps spread karuka seeds.

Names
It is known as mug or moys in the Kalam language of Papua New Guinea.

References

Paramelomys
Rodents of Papua New Guinea
Mammals of Western New Guinea
Rodents of Indonesia
Mammals described in 1908
Taxonomy articles created by Polbot
Rodents of New Guinea
Taxa named by Fredericus Anna Jentink